Pirtskhalaishvili is a 2nd longest Georgian surname which may refer to:

 Joni Pirtskhalaishvili, Georgian lieutenant general
 Aleksandre Pirtskhalaishvili, Georgian historian

Georgian-language surnames